Grey Matter is a 2011 Rwandan film directed by Kivu Ruhorahoza.

Synopsis 
The film tells three stories which are separate and at times connected. In the first one, the young filmmaker Balthazar is looking for money in Kigali to produce his debut film, Le cycle du cafard, but the government refuses to finance a film based on the aftermath of the genocide in Rwanda. In the second, Balthazar's film takes shape and portrays a man, locked up in an asylum, who was an assassin during the war. In the third story, Yvan and Justine, brother and sister, are two young survivors who are trying to rebuild their lives.

Awards 
 Tribeca Film Festival 2011
 Warsaw Film Festival 2011

References

External links 
 

2011 films
Rwandan drama films
Australian drama films
Rwandan genocide films
Films shot in Rwanda